Bertram "Bert" Harris (1916 – 6 March 1982) was an Australian freestyle wrestler who won the flyweight division at the 1950 Empire Games and also competed in the flyweight division at the 1948 Summer Olympics, where he was eliminated in the second round.

References

1916 births
1982 deaths
Olympic wrestlers of Australia
Wrestlers at the 1948 Summer Olympics
Australian male sport wrestlers
Commonwealth Games medallists in wrestling
Commonwealth Games gold medallists for Australia
Wrestlers at the 1950 British Empire Games
Medallists at the 1950 British Empire Games